Dalston is a proposed railway station on the Crossrail 2 line in Dalston, Greater London. It would be an underground station providing interchange with the existing Dalston Kingsland and Dalston Junction stations.

Services

References

Proposed railway stations in London
Transport in the London Borough of Hackney
Dalston